Svartfjellet is a mountain in Loppa Municipality in Troms og Finnmark county, Norway. It lies alongside the small glacier Svartfjelljøkelen, a few kilometers north of the larger glacier Øksfjordjøkelen. The village of Bergsfjord lies about  straight west of the mountain.

For many years, Svartfjellet was regarded as the highest mountain in Finnmark, but this was due to a measurement error. The highest point in Finnmark actually lies on the glacier Øksfjordjøkelen on the mountain Loppatinden.

See also
 List of highest points of Norwegian counties

References

Loppa
Mountains of Troms og Finnmark